Women's suffrage in Uruguay was practically established between 1917 and 1938. Women's suffrage was announced as a principle in the Constitution of Uruguay of 1917, and declared as law in a decree of 1932. The first national election in which women voted was the 1938 Uruguayan general election.

History
Uruguay's 1917 constitution announced the general right of women to vote and hold office at local and national levels in Uruguay. However, to become law, women's suffrage required a two-thirds majority in each legislative house. In 1919 the feminist Paulina Luisi established the Uruguayan Women's Suffrage Alliance, affiliated to the International Women's Suffrage Alliance, to push for women's suffrage. 

A 16 December 1932 decree declared women's eligibility to vote in the national elections scheduled for 1934. Though Gabriel Terra's 1933 coup resulted in those elections not being held, the new 1934 constitution reaffirmed  that "national citizens are all men and women born within the nation [...] every citizen is as such a voter and entitled to hold office". The first national election in which women participated was the 1938 Uruguayan general election.

References

Women's suffrage in Uruguay
Political history of Uruguay
Women's rights in Uruguay